Mississippi Today is a nonprofit news organization based in Ridgeland, Mississippi. It was founded in 2016 by former NBC chairman Andrew Lack.  It is focused on watchdog journalism related to Mississippi's state and local government, economy, environment, public schools and universities, and criminal justice system.

Overview
Mississippi Today started publishing in 2016. It is supported by grants from foundations, including the Knight Foundation and the Ford Foundation, the Overby Center for Southern Journalism and Politics at the University of Mississippi, and via tax deductible contributions from donors such as Jim Barksdale, Archie Manning, and former Mississippi governors Haley Barbour and William Winter. It is owned by Deep South Today (formerly Mississippi News and Information Corporation), a nonprofit organization that was incorporated in 2014.

Personnel
Current staff includes editor-in-chief Adam Ganucheau, a former reporter at the Clarion-Ledger, and CEO Mary Margaret White. The nonprofit newsroom's columnists include sports writer Rick Cleveland and cartoonist Marshall Ramsey.
In 2022, Adam Ganucheau faced journalistic ethical questions regarding his mother, Stephanie Ganucheau, involvement in a Welfare scandal in Mississippi. Source: https://yallpolitics.com/2022/09/27/could-ethical-lapse-in-non-disclosure-undermine-mississippi-todays-coverage-of-tanf-scandal/ )

Awards 
Mississippi Today has won awards for its journalism from the Mississippi Press Association, the Online Journalism Awards, and the Sidney Award from the Hillman Foundation in both 2020 and 2022.

References

External links
Official website

Internet properties established in 2014
Mass media in Jackson, Mississippi
American news websites
2014 establishments in Mississippi
Nonprofit newspapers